Wilamowice is a town in Bielsko County, Silesian Voivodeship, in the south of Poland.

Wilamowice may also refer to the following places:
 Wilamowice, Cieszyn County in Silesian Voivodeship
 Wilamowice, Lower Silesian Voivodeship (south-west Poland)
 Wilamowice, Masovian Voivodeship (east-central Poland)